The Marriott Marquis Houston is a 1000-room Marriott hotel in Houston, Texas. It is the second large hotel located near the George R. Brown Convention Center, to which is connected by a pedestrian sky bridge. It includes six restaurants and a 40,000-square-foot ballroom, the largest in Houston. The hotel is the sixth Marriott Marquis Hotel. It is most famous for the Texas shaped lazy river located on the sixth floor rooftop deck.

The Marriott Marquis Houston was developed in partnership with RIDA Development. RIDA Development also is the prime interest owner. RIDA Development Corporation is a full service real estate organization that has created and invested in innovative and economically successful office, residential, industrial, hospitality and retail developments for more than forty years. RIDA Development's corporate headquarters is located in Houston, TX with regional offices in Orlando, FL; Denver, CO and Warsaw, Poland. These centralized locations allow RIDA to intimately oversee its projects in the US as well as Europe. Among RIDA's strategic relationships is a longstanding partnership with Ares Management with whom they have co-invested in over 4 billion dollars worth of investments and development on three continents.

The Marriott Marquis Houston contains numerous works of art from both local and nationally known artist. A portrait made of spent shell casings of David Mitzner the founder of RIDA Development is on display.

References

External links
 

Marriott hotels
Hotels in Houston
Hotels established in 2016
Hotel buildings completed in 2016